Benjamin Sebastian (June 11, 1741 – November 20, 1832) was a preacher, lawyer, merchant and one of the first judges on the Kentucky Court of Appeals (1792-1806).   He was a participant in the Spanish Conspiracy (also called the Burr Conspiracy), a plan by a cabal of US planters, politicians, and army officers including Aaron Burr to establish an independent country in the southwestern United States (including the state of Kentucky) and parts of Mexico, united with the Spanish government of Louisiana.

Early life
Benjamin Sebastian Jr was born June 11, 1741, in Falls Church, Virginia, to Benjamin Sebastian and Priscilla Elkins. He married Amelia Broadwater on March 20, 1773, in Fairfax, Virginia.

During the American Revolutionary War, he served as a private in the 1st Virginia Regiment.  After the revolution he moved to Kentucky.  He was a lawyer practicing in Louisville, Kentucky by 1785. He served as a delegate to the constitutional convention in 1792.   He was one of the first judges on the Kentucky Court of Appeals (1792-1806).

Spanish Conspiracy
Sebastian was a participant in the Spanish Conspiracy (also called the Burr Conspiracy), a plan conceived during Kentucky's statehood conventions in the 1780s to unite with the Spanish government of Louisiana in order to open a trade route down the Mississippi River to New Orleans. Aaron Burr, Judge Harry Innes, James Wilkinson, and Benjamin Sebastian were all implicated in the conspiracy.

The Conspiracy ended in 1795 after Spain ceded part of the Louisiana Territory and allowed the United States free navigation of the Mississippi River.

In 1806, it was discovered that Judge Sebastian, while he was a member of the Kentucky Court of Appeals, was drawing a pension of $2,000 a year from King Charles of Spain, and on December 6, 1806, the Kentucky House of Representatives voted articles of impeachment against Judge Sebastian.  His lawyer saw that it was a foregone conclusion that the senate would convict Judge Sebastian, so he asked for a compromise, whereby the charges associated with the conspiracy would be dismissed if Sebastian would resign as a Judge on the Court of Appeals.

Later life
After leaving the Court of Appeals, Sebastian purchased land at Falls of Rough in Grayson County, Kentucky on which he erected a grist mill and a saw mill in 1813.

He died on November 20, 1832, in Meade County, Kentucky.

References 

Judges of the Kentucky Court of Appeals
Kentucky lawyers
People of pre-statehood Kentucky
1741 births
1832 deaths
People from Falls Church, Virginia
People from Louisville, Kentucky
People from Meade County, Kentucky
People from Grayson County, Kentucky
Continental Army soldiers
19th-century American lawyers